Percy Gray Doane (1877–1945) was a philatelic dealer from New York City. He was born in Brooklyn on January 13, 1878 and died there on March 28, 1945.

Philatelic activity
Percy Doane established his philatelic dealership and auction house in New York City in 1897 and was highly respected within the philatelic community for his integrity.

Doane conducted a total of 348 auctions of postage stamps and related postal history material during his career. He assisted several notorious stamp collectors, including Col. E. H. R. Green, Judge Robert Emerson, Clarence Eagle and Benno Loewy, to build up or sell their collections or portions of their collections.

Awards
Percy Doane was named to the American Philatelic Society Hall of Fame in 1946.

See also
 Philately
 Philatelic literature

References

1877 births
1945 deaths
American philatelists
American stamp dealers
Businesspeople from New York City
Philatelic auctioneers
American auctioneers
American Philatelic Society